Sony Nordé (born 27 July 1989) is a Haitian footballer who plays as a winger for Malaysia Super League club Terengganu and the Haiti national team.

Club career
After a trial with Mexican side San Luis, he was able to secure a spot at Argentine club Boca Juniors and played for the reserve team. He made a good impression while playing for San Luis's B team, scoring eight goals.

He was named Bangladesh Premier League (football) MVP of 2013–14 when playing for Sheikh Jamal Dhanmondi. From November to December 2014, he appeared with Dhanmondi at the 2014 Bhutan King's Cup and reached to the final, in which, they defeated Pune from India by 1–0.

Norde represented Mohun Bagan in the Indian I-League for the 2014–15 season. He was one of the best players in the I-League with nine goals and 13 assists and played a major role behind Mohun Bagan winning the I-League title on 31 May 2015. He also appeared in the 2015–16 Indian Federation Cup, in which they emerged as champions defeating Aizawl 5–0. Between 2015 and 2017, he scored a total of six goals at the AFC Cup and AFC Champions League for the mariners.

In 2015, and 2016, he was twice loaned out to Indian Super League side Mumbai City.

Norde terminated his contract with Mohun Bagan in January 2018 after suffering from long term injury in the right knee.

After being away from the game for a year, he joined Azerbaijan Premier League club Zira on 17 July 2019.

International career 
Sony Norde has represented the Haiti national football team at the Youth and Senior levels. He represented Haiti at the 2008 CONCACAF Men Olympic qualification tournament.

He appeared in the 2008 Caribbean Cup, as Cuba withdrew early and was replaced by Haiti, but they were bowed out from the group stages. He scored his first international goal against Antigua and Barbuda on 4 December 2008 in a 1–1 draw in that tournament.

International statistics

Career statistics

Honours

Club
Sheikh Jamal Dhanmondi
 Bhutan King's Cup: 2014
 IFA Shield: runner-up 2014
Mohun Bagan
 I-League: 2014–15
 Federation Cup: 2015–16

Individual
 2014 IFA Shield Top Scorer

References

External links
 
 
 Sony Norde at BDFA.com.ar 

1989 births
Living people
Haitian footballers
Haitian expatriate footballers
Haiti international footballers
Expatriate footballers in Argentina
Expatriate footballers in Bangladesh
Expatriate footballers in India
Expatriate footballers in Mexico
Haitian expatriate sportspeople in Argentina
Haitian expatriate sportspeople in Bangladesh
Haitian expatriate sportspeople in India
Haitian expatriate sportspeople in Mexico
Boca Juniors footballers
Sheikh Russel KC players
I-League players
2014 Caribbean Cup players
2015 CONCACAF Gold Cup players
Copa América Centenario players
Association football wingers
Zira FK players
Haitian expatriate sportspeople in Azerbaijan
Expatriate footballers in Azerbaijan
Calcutta Football League players